Lentinellus ursinus is a species of fungus belonging to the family Auriscalpiaceae. Like all species in its genus, it is inedible due to its bitterness.

References

Russulales
Inedible fungi